Tura is the name of several rural localities in Russia:
Tura, Krasnoyarsk Krai, a settlement in Evenkiysky District of Krasnoyarsk Krai
Tura, Udmurt Republic, a village in Agrikolsky Selsoviet of Krasnogorsky District in the Udmurt Republic

See also
Nizhnyaya Tura, a town in Sverdlovsk Oblast
Verkhnyaya Tura, a town in Sverdlovsk Oblast